A Woman is the debut studio album of American rapper and singer Qveen Herby, which was released on May 21, 2021, by Checkbook Records.

Background 
After finishing her forty-five-track EP phase that ran for three years since 2017 beginning with EP 1 and ending with EP 9 in 2020, Herby started working on her first full studio album around October 2020. One of Herby's song, Gucci Vision, was featured in the season 10 premiere of VH1's hit reality show Love & Hip Hop: Atlanta.

Writing and recording
The writing and recording process of the album was completed by the end of February 2021, her and her team moved on to the visual part of the album soon after. She finally announced the album title and release date on April 27, 2021.

Release

Singles
"Juice" was released on April 13, 2021, as the album's lead single and a music video was released on April 16, 2021.
 
"Naughty Girl" was announced with the album's pre-order on April 27, 2021. The song was released as the second single along with the album on May 21, 2021, and with a music video.

Track listing

Personnel 
Credits adapted from the album's liner notes of A Woman.

Musicians 

 Qveen Herby – vocals, background vocals, rap, writer 
 Pompano Puff – record producer, co-writer 
 Nick Noonan –  record producer, co-writer 
 Patrick John Kesack – co-writer

Release history

References

2021 debut albums
Qveen Herby albums
Contemporary R&B albums by American artists
Hip hop albums by American artists